is a town located in Nakagami District, Okinawa Prefecture, Japan. As of October 2016 the town had an estimated population of 28,578 and the density of 2,100 per km².

Name

"Chatan" is an Okinawan name. Also unfamiliar in Japanese is that the "-tan" syllable of "Chatan" is emphasized in Okinawan, although many non-Okinawans place emphasis on "cha-" instead.

Geography

Chatan is located in the central part of Okinawa Island. The town sits on the western coast of the island on the East China Sea. The east of Chatan is hilly and made up of Okinawan limestone. The hills of the eastern part of the town give way to low-lying land towards the coast.

Two rivers run through Chatan west into the East China Sea: the Shiruhi River to the north, and the Futenma River at the south.

Chatan, prior to World War II, was a noted area of rice production in Okinawa. The area was known as Chatan taa-bukkwa, a term in the Okinawa language for a "large area of rice paddies". Much of the land formerly used for rice cultivation is now utilized by military bases.

Chatan is divided into six districts: Kitamae (北前), Mihama (美浜), and Sunabe (砂辺) (which enjoy great popularity among locals and tourists alike - for their many recreational and shopping destinations) as well as the primarily local business and residential wards of Kamiseido (上製頭), Ihei (伊平), and Kuwae (桑江).

Chatan primarily runs along Route 58 and a largely man-made coastline which includes the area of what used to be the U.S. Marine Corps base of Camp Hamby (now Camp Foster). The northern half of Kitamae is nicknamed "Hamby Town" in recognition of this, and the Hamby Post Office is one of the first Japanese Postal offices to have an English name. Parts of Camp Foster and Camp Lester are in Chatan.

The American Kadena Air Base is located on and forms the northern boundary of Chatan which is further demarcated by Route 23 - also known locally as Kokutai Road. The U.S. air base also encompasses much land which was once part of Chatan's area including most of the ward once named Shimoseido.

Neighboring municipalities
City of Okinawa
Ginowan
Kadena
Kitanakagusuku

Economy

Shopping and recreation

Much of the Hamby area is home to the "Hamby Free Zone". Though the name is misleading due to romanization errors, it is a large flea market that is scattered over an area of several blocks, though much of the land it is on is constantly relocated or bought for expansion of businesses. With the expansion of shopping/recreational businesses in the Mihama area, Chatan has become one of the most popular destinations for recreation. It is home to a large ferris wheel (which has become a sort of landmark), a small convention center, several shopping plazas, arcades, karaoke parlors, a 25-story hotel named "The Beach Tower" and several beaches. Sunabe is famous for a large sea wall which attracts many SCUBA divers and surfers.

The Chunichi Dragons of Nippon Professional Baseball have their spring training camp in Chatan.

Education

The Town of Chatan maintains four elementary schools:  (北谷町立北谷小学校),  (北谷町立北谷第二小学校), Kitatama (北谷町立北玉小学校), and Hamagawa (北谷町立浜川小学校); each elementary school has an associated nursery school. (沖縄県立北谷高等学校), a prefectural senior high school, is located directly north of the town hall.

Transportation

Chatan is crossed from north to south by Japan National Route 58, which runs parallel to the coastal area of the town.

Delta Air Lines has a city ticket office in the Towa Building #1 (東和第一ビル Tōwa Daiichi Biru) in Chatan. Northwest Airlines previously operated a city ticket office in Chatan.

References

External links

 Chatan official website 
 Chatan Tourism Information

Towns in Okinawa Prefecture